Theacrine, also known as 1,3,7,9-tetramethyluric acid, is a purine alkaloid found in Cupuaçu (Theobroma grandiflorum) and in a Chinese tea known as kucha (Camellia assamica var. kucha). It shows anti-inflammatory and analgesic effects and appears to affect adenosine signalling in a manner similar to caffeine. In kucha leaves, theacrine is synthesized from caffeine in what is thought to be a three-step pathway. Theacrine and caffeine are structurally similar.

Safety
Theacrine has demonstrated clinical safety and non-habituating effects in healthy humans over 8 weeks of daily use at up to 300 mg/day. Moreover, there was no evidence of tachyphylaxis that is typical of neuroactive agents such as caffeine and other stimulants.

In animal studies, theacrine has an LD50 of 810 mg/kg, compared to 265 mg/kg for caffeine.

See also
 Liberine
 Methylliberine
 Theobromine
 Theophylline

References

Adenosine receptor antagonists
Alkaloids
Purines